This is a list of the Australian moth species of the family Pterophoridae. It also acts as an index to the species articles and forms part of the full List of moths of Australia.

Deuterocopinae
Deuterocopus atrapex T. B. Fletcher, 1909
Deuterocopus honoratus Meyrick, 1921
Deuterocopus socotranus Rebel, 1907
Deuterocopus tengstroemi Zeller, 1852
Hexadactilia civilis Meyrick, 1921
Hexadactilia trilobata T. B. Fletcher, 1910

Ochyroticinae
Ochyrotica kurandica Arenberger, 1988

Pterophorinae
Bipunctiphorus euctimena (Turner, 1913)
Cosmoclostis aglaodesma Meyrick, 1886
Cosmoclostis hemiadelpha T. B. Fletcher, 1947
Cosmoclostis pesseuta Meyrick, 1906
Hellinsia balanotes (Meyrick, 1908)
Hellinsia lienigianus (Zeller, 1852)
Hellinsia tinctidactylus (Newman, 1856)
Hepalastis pumilio (Zeller, 1873)
Imbophorus aptalis (Walker, 1864)
Imbophorus leucophasma (Turner, 1911)
Imbophorus pallidus Arenberger, 1991
Lantanophaga pusillidactyla (Walker, 1864)
Megalorhipida leucodactylus (Fabricius, 1794) (syn: Trichoptilus adelphodes Meyrick, 1887)
Nippoptilia cinctipedalis (Walker, 1864)
Oxyptilus regulus Meyrick, 1906
Platyptilia celidotus (Meyrick, 1885)
Platyptilia isodactyla (Zeller, 1852)
(Platyptilia omissalis T. B. Fletcher, 1926)
Pterophorus albidus (Zeller, 1852)
Pterophorus lacteipennis (Walker, 1864)
Sinpunctiptilia emissalis Walker, 1864
Sinpunctiptilia tasmaniae Arenberger, 2006
Sphenarches anisodactylus (Walker, 1864)
Sphenarches zanclistes (Meyrick, 1905)
Stangeia xerodes (Meyrick, 1886)
Stenodacma pyrrhodes (Meyrick, 1889)
Stenoptilia leuconephes (Meyrick, 1886)
Stenoptilia phaeonephes (Meyrick, 1886)
Stenoptilia zophodactylus (Duponchel, 1840)
Stenoptilodes taprobanes (R. Felder & Rogenhofer, 1875)
Tetraschalis arachnodes Meyrick, 1887
Tomotilus saitoi Yano, 1961
Trichoptilus ceramodes Meyrick, 1886
Trichoptilus inclitus T.P. Lucas, 1892
Trichoptilus scythrodes Meyrick, 1886
Wheeleria spilodactylus (Curtis, 1827)
Xyroptila elegans Kovtunovich & Ustjuzhanin, 2006
Xyroptila kuranda Kovtunovich & Ustjuzhanin, 2006
Xyroptila marmarias Meyrick, 1908
Xyroptila peltastes (Meyrick, 1908)
Xyroptila uluru Kovtunovich & Ustjuzhanin, 2006

External links 
Pterophoridae at Australian Faunal Directory
Pterophoridae at Australian Insects
Draft Checklist of Australian Pterophoroidea

Australia
Austalia